New Braunfels Independent School District (NBISD) is a public school district in New Braunfels, Texas (United States).

Located in Comal County, a small portion of the district extends into Guadalupe County.

In 2009, it was rated "academically acceptable" by the Texas Education Agency and it received a "B" under new standards put into place in 2018.

The district's population was growing at 3% annually as of 2019, slower than the neighboring Comal Independent School District.

Schools
Due to 10% growth in the prior decade, the district issued a bond to open new school buildings, which were projected to open between 2021 and 2023. This also included the closure of the former New Braunfels High School Ninth Grade Center.
The new Ninth Grade Center is planned to become Long Creek High School.

High school
Grades 10-12
New Braunfels High School
Grade 9
New Braunfels High School Ninth Grade Center
Grades 9-12
School of Choice

Middle schools
Grades 6-8
New Braunfels Middle School
Oak Run Middle School

Elementary schools
Grades K-5
Carl Schurz Elementary School
Klein Road Elementary School
Memorial Elementary School - Formerly known as Memorial Intermediate
Seele Elementary School
Walnut Springs Elementary School - Formerly known as Memorial Elementary
County Line Elementary School - Formerly known as Memorial Primary
Lamar Elementary School
Veramendi Elementary School
Voss Farms Elementary School
Pre-Kindergarten
Lone Star Early Childhood Center - Formerly known as Lone Star Elementary School

References

External links
New Braunfels ISD

School districts in Comal County, Texas
School districts in Guadalupe County, Texas
New Braunfels, Texas